Extra Half-Brite, usually abbreviated as EHB, is a planar display mode of the Amiga computer. 

This mode uses six bitplanes (six bits/pixel). The first five bitplanes index 32 colors selected from a 12-bit color space (4096 possible colors). If the bit on the sixth bitplane is set, the display hardware halves the brightness of the corresponding color component. This way 64 simultaneous colors are possible (32 arbitrary colors plus 32 half-bright components) while only using 32 color registers. The number of color registers is a hardware limitation of pre-AGA chipsets used in Amiga computers.

Some contemporary game titles and animations used EHB mode as a hardware-assisted means to display shadows or silhouettes. EHB was also often used as general-purpose 64 color mode with the aforementioned restrictions.

Some early versions of the first Amiga, the Amiga 1000 sold in the United States lack the EHB video mode, which is present in all later Amiga models.

See also

 Original Chip Set
 Hold-And-Modify

References

External links
Animated demo using Halfbrite mode (requires Java)
Amiga Graphics Archive - Extra Half-Brite

Computer display standards
Amiga
Color depths